Composite epoxy materials (CEM) are a group of composite materials typically made from woven glass fabric surfaces and non-woven glass core combined with epoxy synthetic resin. They are typically used in printed circuit boards.

There are different types of CEMs:

 CEM-1 is low-cost, flame-retardant, cellulose-paper-based laminate with only one layer of woven glass fabric.
 CEM-2 has cellulose paper core and woven glass fabric surface.
 CEM-3 is very similar to the most commonly used PCB material, FR-4. Its color is white, and it is flame-retardant.
 CEM-4 quite similar as CEM-3 but not flame-retardant.
 CEM-5 (also called CRM-5) has polyester woven glass core.

See also

References

Composite materials
Electronic design
Fibre-reinforced polymers